The Boys' Singles tournament of the 2018 European Junior Badminton Championships was held from September 11-16. Toma Junior Popov from France clinched this title in the last edition. Irish' Nhat Nguyen leads the seedings this year.

Seeded

  Nhat Nguyen (semi-finals)
  Arnaud Merklé (champions)
  Christo Popov (finals)
  Chris Grimley (third round)
  Cristian Savin (quarter-finals)
  Zach Russ (quarter-finals)
  Julien Carraggi (quarter-finals)
  Lukas Resch (semi-finals)
  Dennis Koppen (fourth round)
  Danylo Bosniuk (fourth round)
  Giovanni Toti (third round)
  Markus Barth (fourth round)
  Tomás Toledano (fourth round)
  Georgii Karpov (quarter-finals)
  Enrico Baroni (second round)
  Brian Holtschke (third round)'

Draw

Finals

Top Half

Section 1

Section 2

Section 3

Section 4

Bottom Half

Section 5

Section 6

Section 7

Section 8

References

External links 
Main Draw

European Junior Badminton Championships